Park Do-geun (born 1 October 1930) is a South Korean former sports shooter. He competed at the 1972 Summer Olympics and the 1976 Summer Olympics.

References

External links
  

1930 births
Possibly living people
South Korean male sport shooters
Olympic shooters of South Korea
Shooters at the 1972 Summer Olympics
Shooters at the 1974 Asian Games
Shooters at the 1976 Summer Olympics
Place of birth missing (living people)
Asian Games medalists in shooting
Asian Games gold medalists for South Korea
Medalists at the 1974 Asian Games
20th-century South Korean people